Seneca Lake or Lake Seneca may refer to:

Seneca Lake (New York), the largest of the Finger Lakes in upstate New York
Seneca Lake AVA, New York wine region
Lake Seneca, Ohio, an unincorporated community
Seneca Lake (Ohio), another name for Senecaville Lake